Abadkənd (also, Abadkend and Dzhindyrly) is a village and municipality in the Salyan Rayon of Azerbaijan.  It has a population of 2,680.

References 

Populated places in Salyan District (Azerbaijan)